Michalis Music (born February 4, 1999) is a Cypriot footballer of Serbian descent who plays as a midfielder for ASIL.

External links
 
 soccerstand.com

1999 births
Living people
Cypriot footballers
Cypriot people of Serbian descent
AEK Larnaca FC players
Ethnikos Achna FC players
Ayia Napa FC players
P.O. Xylotymbou players
ASIL Lysi players
Cypriot First Division players
Cypriot Second Division players
Association football midfielders